Istaravshan is a city in Sughd Province in Tajikistan. In 2000, the Tajik government changed the name of the city from earlier Uroteppa (Ura-Tyube). 

The city lies in the northern foothills of the Turkistan mountain range, 78 kilometers southwest of Khujand, on the main road connecting Tajikistan's two largest cities, Khujand and Dushanbe. Bordered by Uzbekistan in the north and west, and Kyrgyzstan in the east, the territorial area of Istaravshan stretches 1,830 square kilometers, and with an administrative population of 273,500 people, the majority of its citizens (76%) live in the outlying countryside.

Istaravshan is a city-museum, one of central Asia's oldest towns of commerce and crafts. 2002 saw the 2.500 anniversary of the city celebrated by Istaravshan. The city is one of three proposed locations of ancient Cyropolis built on the north-eastern outskirts of the Achaemenid Empire by the king Cyrus in the 6th century B.C.

Climate
Istaravshan has a cold semi-arid climate (Köppen climate classification BSk). There is more rainfall in winter than in summer. About  of precipitation falls annually.

Subdivisions

Before ca. 2018, Istaravshan was the seat of Istaravshan District, which covered the rural part of the present city of Istaravshan. The city of Istaravshan covers Istaravshan proper and ten jamoats. These are as follows:

Istaravshan on stamps

Notable people 

 Ulmas Mirsaidovich Mirsaidov (born 1945), theoretical chemist and professor

See also
 List of cities in Tajikistan
 Osrūshana

References

Populated places in Sughd Region
Jamoats of Tajikistan